Events from the year 1927 in Argentina

Incumbents
 President: Marcelo Torcuato de Alvear
 Vice president: Elpidio González

Governors
 Buenos Aires Province: Valentin Vergara 
 Cordoba: Ramón J. Cárcano
 Mendoza Province: Alejandro Orfila

Vice Governors
 Buenos Aires Province: Victoriano de Ortúzar

Events
14 April – An earthquake in Mendoza Province causes three deaths and several injuries.
29 November – The World Chess Championship, played in Buenos Aires over a period of more than two months, is won by Russian Alexander Alekhine, scoring +6−3=25.

Births
18 February – Osvaldo Bayer, writer and journalist (died 2018)
23 February – Mirtha Legrand and Silvia Legrand, twin actresses
3 June – Eliseo Mouriño, footballer (died 1961)
19 June – Luciano Benjamín Menéndez, Argentine general (died 2018)
2 July – Jaime Rest, translator, literary critic, writer and teacher (died 1979)

Deaths
31 October – Ricardo Güiraldes, novelist and poet (born 1886)

See also
 1927 in Argentine football

References

 
Years of the 20th century in Argentina